Jason Oppenheim (born April 12, 1977) is an American real estate broker, attorney, influencer and reality TV personality. He is the president and founder of The Oppenheim Group, a real estate brokerage representing buyers and sellers of luxury properties in Los Angeles and Orange County. Jason Oppenheim, together with his twin brother Brett, and their team of real estate agents at The Oppenheim Group are the subject of the Netflix Original Series, Selling Sunset, which premiered on March 22, 2019. The show features Oppenheim and his team as they sell the 'luxe' life to affluent and celebrity buyers in LA. In May 2022, it was announced that The Opphenheim Group’s Orange County office will be subject to a spin-off of Selling Sunset called Selling the OC, produced by Netflix.

Background
Jason Oppenheim was born on April 12, 1977. Oppenheim's great-great-grandfather Jacob Stern moved to Hollywood in 1889, where he became a real estate entrepreneur of early Los Angeles, after founding The Stern Realty Co. The Oppenheim Group represents five generations of real estate development, management, and brokerage services in Los Angeles. Their family is of Jewish descent.

Early life and education 
Oppenheim grew up in Northern California, where he attended Mission San Jose High School in Fremont, California. He received his undergraduate and J.D. degrees from the University of California, Berkeley.

Career

Law 
Oppenheim worked as an attorney at the international law firm O’Melveny & Myers from 2003–2007, where he represented a broad range of corporate clients.

Real Estate 
For many years, Oppenheim has been identified as a Top Agent in Los Angeles by The Hollywood Reporter, and Showbiz Real Estate Elite by Variety.

His clientele includes many high-profile celebrities, professional athletes, and businesspeople, including Kris Humphries, Chloë Grace Moretz, Orlando Bloom, Joel Kinnaman, Chris McGurk, Taye Diggs. He has also sold properties to Nicole Scherzinger, Jessica Alba, Dakota Johnson, among others.

In early 2021, Oppenheim opened a second office in the seaside neighborhood of Corona Del Mar, in the city of Newport Beach, California.

Personal life 
In July 2021, he confirmed he had been in a relationship with Selling Sunset co-star Chrishell Stause, which ended in December 2021.

References 

1977 births
Living people
People from Palo Alto, California
American real estate brokers
20th-century American Jews
21st-century American Jews
University of California, Berkeley alumni
UC Berkeley School of Law alumni